Gabriel Allon is the main protagonist in Daniel Silva's thriller and espionage series that focuses on Israeli intelligence. The main characters refer to their employer as 'the Office', although it is not specified that it is Mossad (known internally in the Israeli intelligence community as HaMisrad [עברית: המשרד], literally 'the Office'). Allon's career began in 1972 when he, Eli Lavon and several others were plucked from civilian life by Ari Shamron to participate in Operation Wrath of God, an act of vengeance to hunt down and eliminate those responsible for killing the Israel athletes in Munich. Wrath of God is referenced in the books throughout the course of his life.

Character biography
Allon is portrayed as a sabra whose first language was German. He was raised Jewish, albeit in a secular home in the Jezreel Valley, and was not familiar with Shabbat candles until he saw them as an adult. That his parents, specifically his mother Irene, were Holocaust survivors (from Berlin) is a thread throughout the series. His mother's unwillingness to discuss her Holocaust experience is often alluded to, it being a part of what makes Allon such a good spy and master of secrets. Beyond his being a Holocaust survivor, not much is known of Allon's father beyond his death in the Six-Day War and that he was born and raised in Munich.

According to Shamron, Gabriel's name was chosen for a reason: "Your mother named you Gabriel for a reason. Michael is the highest [angel], but you, Gabriel, are the mightiest. You're the one who defends Israel against its accusers. You're the angel of judgment -- the Prince of Fire."

Several books in the series make reference to Allon's linguistic versatility, and it is confirmed that he speaks fluent English, French, German, Hebrew, and Italian as well passable Arabic and Spanish. In The Prince of Fire, Silva lets the readers know that German, which Allon speaks with the Berlin accent of his mother, is his first language and remains the language of his dreams. According to press for The English Girl, Allon is in his 60s.

Allon's grandfather was a well-known Berlin-based German Expressionist painter who passed his talents on to his daughter (Gabriel's mother) before he was killed at Auschwitz in January 1943. She, in turn, passed these talents to Gabriel. Allon served in the army and chose to attend the Bezalel Academy of Art and Design.

At Bezalel in Jerusalem in 1972, Shamron approached Allon to join "The Office" and to take part in the retribution operation being carried out by Israel against the Black September terrorists in retaliation for perpetrating the Munich massacre at the 1972 Summer Olympics. Gabriel was one of the primary assassins in the operation conducted across Europe, which lasted three years and resulted in the derailment of Gabriel's then-likely future career as a painter.

In the aftermath, Allon left The Office and went under cover as Italian art restorer Mario Delvecchio. He lived in Cornwall while working for London-based art dealer Julian Isherwood. However, he was convinced to reluctantly return to The Office while simultaneously continuing to work as Delvecchio in England and Italy as his primary unofficial cover, which also continues to play a large role in Allon's life.  After long efforts to resist the move, Gabriel eventually becomes head of The Office.

In January 1991, while on assignment in Vienna, Allon's car was bombed, resulting in the death of his son and serious injury to his wife, Leah. His wife survived and lived in a psychiatric hospital on Mount Herzl, not far from where their son is buried on the Mount of Olives. Allon felt he had to make peace with Leah's situation before he could propose to, or marry, Chiara, the Italian-born Office field operative who later becomes his second wife. His son's ghost frequently haunts Allon, especially after Chiara's miscarriage following her kidnapping and their ensuing inability to conceive.  After several years, Chiara gets pregnant again and delivers twins–a girl Irene, named in memory of Gabriel’s mother, and a boy, Raphael.

Real-life spies that may have inspired some elements of Allon's fictional biography include Peter Malkin and Mike Harari.

Real world impact
The books are never explicit in the year in which they're set, although there are sometimes references to real-world events, such as the changing American presidency. While names are changed in the book, the fallout from the assassination of journalist Jamal Khashoggi in the Saudi Arabian Embassy in Istanbul is key to the plot of The New Girl. In The Fallen Angel, Allon makes references to meeting Chiara ten years prior, which roughly matches up to the books' annual releases. However some titles, especially Moscow Rules and The Defector take place within greater proximity to one another based on the books' events.
In an interview that coincided with the release of Moscow Rules, Silva revealed he heard an art professional quote Allon and some real-world news accounts make reference to the Allon series and wonder whether the specific news will become part of the series.

Main characters

Gabriel's Team
Allon's team is known by the code name Barak, the Hebrew word for lightning. and most of his team plays a role throughout the novels in the series. Some of them include:

Ari Shamron — former head of the Office. A Polish-born Jew from Lviv, his parents sent him to Israel as a teenager before the war; consequently he was the only member from his entire extended family to survive the Holocaust.  Shamron is a father figure and mentor to Gabriel and the person who recruited him into the Office with the three-year Wrath of God operation. To Allon and his team, he's known as the Memuneh (Hebrew for 'the one in charge'). He is officially retired as the head of the Office, but it still remains his private fiefdom; he groomed and raised an entire generation of its officers, many of whom comprise much of the service's current senior management and executive staff. Eventually after the departure of two of his successors, he makes Uzi Navot the director general of the Office after finally giving up trying to perpetually force Gabriel to take the job (who repeatedly refused to accept the position). He is known throughout the Israeli intelligence community as the Old Man, being one of the last remaining members of the generation of spymasters who founded the state back in 1948 and as a result whose advice and counsel is still sought out regularly by the highest ranking leaders of the current Israeli defense and security establishment. While his age isn't explicitly referenced (or consistent through the series) his aging and health is of concern to Allon and his team; it is mentioned many times that he is also an incessant chain-smoker of sixty filthy, vile-smelling Turkish cigarettes daily.  Gilah, Ari's long suffering wife, frequently plays a role as a mother figure to Gabriel and his team. Shamron's niece Rimona Stern is a key figure in Gabriel's team. While Shamron's character is clearly based in history (he is known to Gabriel and his team [as well as most Israelis] as the man who apprehended Adolf Eichmann in Buenos Aires) his real-world character is never identified in the novels. However, in an interview, Silva said that Shamron is a composite of several historical figures including Isser Harel, head of Mossad when Eichmann was apprehended. Following this connection, Harel wanted to meet Silva, but they were not able to establish a meeting before Harel died.
Chiara Allon (née Zolli) — Gabriel's wife and now retired Office agent whom he meets in The Confessor. She is the extraordinarily beautiful and intelligent daughter of Venice's chief rabbi. After what happened with his wife and son, he wasn't sure he could ever let himself fall in love another woman ever again, and it took several years (and the light but unending pressure and reminding of Shamron and his wife) for him to be willing to marry Chiara. When they first meet at her father's office in Venice during the course of his investigation into a Brenzone abbey (in the third book), he does not realize Chiara is a member of the Office, later having been assigned to follow him while he was in Rome. When he escapes while under fire (and wounded) from the Carabinieri who have been sent to apprehend him at a Rome hotel (albeit on a false tip), she saves his life when he is cornered in an Rome alleyway by an assassin in pursuit, appearing at the last moment on a motorcycle, taking him to an Office safehouse where she bandages his wounds and sits awake at his bedside with a pistol in her lap through the night, standing guard over him while he sleeps. She holds a master's degree in history from the University of Padua. Her own background and understanding of art and history as someone who grew up in the Jewish ghetto in Venice is a nice complement to Allon's art restoring work.
Uzi Navot – first appears early in the series as the Office chief of station in Paris, steadily advancing to assume responsibility for supervision for all western European case officers, later director of special operations and as Office director general. He is not viewed as successful in this role and is eventually replaced by Gabriel, who convinces Navot to remain and work under Allon.  Like Gabriel, he is the son of Holocaust survivors (albeit several years younger and from a long lineage of Viennese Jews). Also very linguistically versatile; known to be fluent in English, French, German and Hebrew, as well as speaking passable Arabic and Spanish. He eventually marries Bella, his longtime on-and-off lover, who is a university professor in Israel. Uzi's appetite and fluctuating weight is regularly mentioned as a problem for him, as well as Bella's unremitting monitoring and occasional verbal scolding of him for it, much to the amusement of other characters.  
Eli Lavon — a former Office agent who is now a professor of biblical archaeology at Hebrew University in Jerusalem. The wispy haired professor is usually on an excavation when Gabriel recruits him to take part in another job. Their history together dates back to Gabriel Allon's first mission, Operation Wrath of God, for which Lavon was an ayin, a tracker and surveillance specialist. He is known as the finest street surveillance operative that the Office has ever produced; No recruit graduates from the Office training academy without spending a few days studying at the feet of Eli Lavon. After the Wrath of God operation he resigned from the Office and moved to Vienna, where until the bombing at the beginning of the 4th novel, he was the director of a very successful Holocaust restitution research and investigative agency named the Bureau of Wartime Claims and Inquiries. Lavon is shown to speak fluent English, German, Hebrew and Russian, as well as passable French. It is stated that Lavon is several years older than Gabriel and that he has known Gabriel longer and better than anyone else among the supporting cast, except Ari Shamron.
Shimon Pazner – Negev-born Office chief of station in Rome (which doubles as headquarters for Office operations throughout the Mediterranean). Usually interacts or meets with Gabriel during operations in Italy. Gabriel's requesting and Pazner's granting of unwarranted favors and Gabriel's subsequent actions usually end up destroying Pazner's goodwill towards him and often nearly his career in the process.  
Dina Sarid — an Office research department analyst driven by an attack by a suicide bomber that injured her and killed her mother and two sisters. She still walks with a limp. Her encyclopedic knowledge of names, faces and dates of terrorist attacks is second to none. Is part of the assorted group that comprises Gabriel's Barak team that assembles on short notice in response to occurrences of terrorist attacks and operations.
Rimona Stern—Shamron's niece who Allon has known since she was a child. A major in the IDF's military intelligence directorate, in later books it is stated that she assigned to Israel's joint task force assigned to deal with Iran's increasing imminent nuclear ambitions.
Mikhail Abramov — Moscow-born former special forces officer currently on loan to the Office from the IDF's elite Sayeret Matkal special operations unit. Has been described as Gabriel without a conscience, having dismantled a large portion of the upper echelons of Hamas and Islamic Jihad "practically by himself". Was romantically linked to Sarah Bancroft. 
Yaakov Rossman — an active case officer in Shabak who serves in the Arab Affairs department, running agents and sources inside the West Bank and Gaza. Speaks fluent Arabic. Known as one of Shabak's most skilled interrogators.  
Oded — German-speaking agent often used by Gabriel as an all-purpose operative who specializes in the direct (and often lethal) action portions of Gabriel's operations (kidnappings, interrogations, mobile hit-and-runs, etc.) Usually brought in by Gabriel with Mordecai. 
Mordecai — usually brought in by Gabriel with Oded. The primary tech specialist and troubleshooter within Gabriel's team, specializing in vehicular surveillance, communications, and electronics equipment/devices.

Combat/Muscle Section

There is no part of the team that is actually called that (or something similar) in the series, but what it refers to is the specific members of Gabriel's team that have significant combat training and generally support Gabriel during the more physical and deadly aspects of his operations (armed and hand-to-hand combat, kidnappings, interrogations, and executions) while all the other members of his team stay behind. This usually includes:
Mikhail: (always). As the member of the team with the most advanced combat/special forces training (armed, hand to hand, and otherwise) aside from Gabriel, Mikhail usually acts as Gabriel's motorcycle driver on drive-by hits (or vice versa), as well as his primary partner while executing targets on foot.
Yaakov: an integral part of this section, specializing primarily in conducting interrogations but also usually present while conducting surveillance, armed assaults as well as kidnappings. Occasionally acts as Gabriel's driver. 
Uzi: when present. Although not an expert like Gabriel and Mikhail (or always in the best of shape physically), as a katsa Uzi has extensive combat and firearms training. Also as easily the largest man on Gabriel's team in terms of size he is usually the one who breaches the entrances when the element of surprise is no longer a factor. 
Oded: when present. Participating in any physical aspects, doing a little of everything.

Other recurring characters
Leah Allon - like Gabriel, an artist, she was severely burned in the bomb attack that killed their son and left her physically and mentally impaired.  Other than for brief instances of lucidity, a combination of depression and post-traumatic stress has left her mind permanently replaying the events leading up to the Vienna bombing.  She had been originally placed in a psychiatric hospital in England, but after a kidnapping, she was moved to an Israeli hospital on Mount Herzl.
Sarah Bancroft — CIA officer who worked with Gabriel and his Office team on several assignments. The daughter of a wealthy Citibank executive, she spent most of her early years being educated at the finest boarding schools throughout western Europe, returning to the States to attend university. Holds a bachelor's in art history from Dartmouth; studied at the Courtauld Institute of Art in London before receiving a Ph.D from Harvard, where she was the author of a highly acclaimed doctoral dissertation on the German Expressionists. In the aftermath of the 9/11 attacks (in which her fiancée was killed) she applied to the CIA, but was dismissed. When Carter arranges for Gabriel to meet her during The Messenger as a prospective candidate for an assignment in a joint US-Israeli deep cover operation, she was working as a curator at the Phillips Collection in Washington. Later in the series, after working with him on an operation, she dated Mikhail for a significant period (much to Gabriel's consternation).
Graham Seymour — the Oxbridge-educated deputy director general of MI5, known to be several years older than Gabriel. Shown to be a very strict by-the-book officer in regards to operational parameters (often legally-speaking) and very much attuned to internal British politics in regards to MI5/MI6. Often very hesitant and wary to grant Gabriel permission to operate on British soil and very quick to reprimand Gabriel's actions and distance himself if their joint operations go awry. Over the course of the series, he begins to see Gabriel and the Israelis in a much more forgiving light, to the point where in the later books he considered Gabriel to be a good and trusted friend, especially after The English Spy, when he becomes the director general of MI6. After UK Prime Minister Jonathan Lancaster's mistress Madeline Hart is kidnapped and vanishes, he turns to Seymour for help, who entrusts Gabriel with the task of investigating. After Gabriel is successful in unearthing the kidnapping plot, the Russian government's involvement, and locating and rescuing Madeline Hart and returning her to London, his esteem for Gabriel increases significantly. 
Adrian Carter – longtime CIA director of operations, later director of clandestine services. Known to be a polyglot. Has a decades-long working relationship with Shamron (known to be several years older than Carter) as well as a strong professional and personal relationship with Seymour. His service (the CIA) generally ends up footing the bill of all of the Anglo-Israeli joint operations and is responsible for the documentation (passports, visas, etc.), as well as logistical relations and political support from other countries not usually involved and their corresponding security and intelligence services. His relations with Gabriel tend to be much warmer than Seymour's. 
Julian Isherwood, born Isakowitz — the son of a Jewish Parisian art dealer, he was smuggled out of France before the Nazis killed his father. He is owner of Isherwood Fine Arts, a London-based art gallery specializing in Old Masters. Was recruited as a sayan by Shamron in the mid-1970s for one very specific purpose: to facilitate and maintain the identity of Mario Delvecchio, a Cornwall-based Italian expatriate art restorer of Old Masters paintings; in reality the operational cover of Gabriel Allon.
Christopher Keller —  The London-born son of Harley Street physicians, Keller enlisted in the British Army against the wishes of his parents and was accepted into the Special Air Service, becoming known as one of its most talented and accomplished operatives, assigned to the Sabre squadron, specializing in desert warfare. He served undercover in Belfast in the mid-1980s, until he was caught by the IRA and tortured. He managed to escape and kill all of his captors in the process. In 1991, he was deployed to Iraq with his SAS squadron, and was thought to have been killed as a result of a friendly fire incident. He survived, and managed to make his way to Corsica, where Don Orsati took him into his employ as one of his professional assassins, becoming his most valuable employee. He was the antagonist in The English Assassin but returned in The English Girl,  The Heist and The English Spy to work with Gabriel and his team. At the end of The English Spy, he returned to service with the United Kingdom. At the end of The New Girl, Keller is romantically linked to Sarah Bancroft.

Titles
The Kill Artist (2000)
The English Assassin (2002)
The Confessor (2003)
A Death in Vienna (2004)
Prince of Fire (2005)
The Messenger (2006)
The Secret Servant (2007)
Moscow Rules (2008)
The Defector (2009)
The Rembrandt Affair (2010)
Portrait of a Spy (2011)
The Fallen Angel (2012)
The English Girl (2013)
The Heist (2014)
 The English Spy (2015)
 The Black Widow (2016)
 House of Spies (2017)
 The Other Woman (2018)
 The New Girl (2019)
 The Order (2020)
 The Cellist (2021)
 Portrait of an Unknown Woman (2022)

References

Novels set in Israel
Novels by Daniel Silva
Allon, Gabriel
Allon, Gabriel
Allon, Gabriel
Book series introduced in 2000